Rameshwar Prasad Sinha (also transliterated as Rameshwar Prasad Singh) was an Indian statesman and a participant in the Indian independence movement. He was a Member of the Constituent Assembly of India which was elected to write the Constitution of India, and served as its first Parliament as an independent nation. He was also a Member of the Legislative Assembly of Bihar. He was known for his oratorical skills and his speeches to the masses, both in English and Hindi. He started practising law in 1915, but gave it up in 1921 to take part in Mahatma Gandhi's non-co-operation movement. He was imprisoned twice during the freedom struggle.

His only daughter Kishori Sinha was also a Two-term Member of Parliament from the Vaishali constituency and is married to Satyendra Narayan Sinha a former Chief Minister of Bihar. He died in 1965.

References

Bibliography 
Members of Constituent Assembly from Bihar
 A gentleman among politicians
A plea for the reconstruction of Indian polity

1965 deaths
Indian National Congress politicians from Bihar
Members of the Bihar Legislative Assembly
Indian independence activists from Bihar
Scholars from Bihar
Indian socialists
Members of the Constituent Assembly of India
Year of birth missing
20th-century Indian non-fiction writers
Indian legal writers